Lajos Szűcs (born 8 August 1973) is a Hungarian former professional footballer who played as a goalkeeper. In his career, he played 307 matches in the Hungarian first division and scored a total of five goals. He played three matches in the Bundesliga during 1. FC Kaiserslautern's league-winning campaign of the 1997–98 season.

He is widely criticised by fans of Újpest FC for leaving the club to play for Ferencváros.

International career 
Szűcs was born in Budapest. He made his first appearance in the Hungarian national team against Moldova in 2002, then gained two more caps against Japan (2004) and Saudi Arabia (2005).

During the 1995–96 season, Szűcs was a member of the Hungary Olympic football team, which won qualification to the 1996 Summer Olympics in Atlanta. Szűcs was left on the bench all three group games of Hungary. Hungary lost all of their three group matches on the Olympics, their opponent including future gold medal winners Nigeria, and Brazil.

Honours
1.FC Kaiserslautern
 Bundesliga: 1997–98
Ferencváros
 Nemzeti Bajnokság: 2001-02, 2003-04
 Magyar Kupa: 2002-03, 2003-04

References

External links
 
 Profile on HLSZ.hu 
 
 
 

1973 births
Living people
Footballers from Budapest
Hungarian footballers
Hungary international footballers
Olympic footballers of Hungary
Footballers at the 1996 Summer Olympics
Hungary under-21 international footballers
Association football goalkeepers
Újpest FC players
1. FC Kaiserslautern players
Ferencvárosi TC footballers
Lombard-Pápa TFC footballers
Dunaújváros FC players
Bundesliga players
Nemzeti Bajnokság I players
Hungarian expatriate footballers
Expatriate footballers in Germany
Hungarian expatriate sportspeople in Germany